Choerades is a genus of robber flies described by Francis Walker in 1851, belonging to the family Asilidae, subfamily Laphriinae.

Description
Genus Choerades is closely related to the genera Laphria and Bombomima. They can mainly be distinguished by genitalic differences in males, as the shape of the upper forceps or the evolution of lamellae from the fusion of bristles, but also for the length of hairs and bristles on the facial gibbosity. The adults' average sizes reach . These robber flies are quite hairy, their body is usually black, while the bee-mimicking abdomen shows black and yellow stripes. They generally prey on insects of a variety of species, including flies, bees, wasps and beetles.

Distribution
The species of this genus are distributed in most of Europe, the Eastern Palearctic realm, the Near East, and the Nearctic realm.

Species

Choerades castellanii (Hradský, 1962)
Choerades dioctriaeformis (Meigen, 1820)
Choerades femorata (Meigen, 1804)
Choerades fimbriata (Meigen, 1820)
Choerades fortunata Baez & Weinberg, 1981
Choerades fuliginosa (Panzer, 1798)
Choerades fulva (Meigen, 1804)
Choerades gilva (Linnaeus, 1758)
Choerades ignea (Meigen, 1820)
Choerades lapponica (Zetterstedt, 1838)
Choerades loewi (Lehr, 1992)
Choerades marginata (Linnaeus, 1758)
Choerades mouchai Hradský, 1985
Choerades rufipes (Fallén, 1814)
Choerades venatrix (Loew, 1847)

References
 Fauna Europaea Fritz Geller-Grimm & M. * J. Smart - Provisional key to the Central European species of the genus Choerades Walker
 Gbif
 Nagatomi Akira - Japanese Journal of Entomology The Status of the Genera Laphria, Choerades and Bombomima
 Norman T. Baker and Roland L. Fisher - Michigan Entomological Society 1975 A Taxonomic and Ecologic Study of the Asilidae of Michigan
 Eugène A. SÉGUY - Diptères-Brachycères. Asilidae, etc. (Faune de France. vol. 17.)

Laphriinae
Asilidae genera
Articles containing video clips
Asilomorph flies of Europe